Allen Adler (December 25, 1916 – January 30, 1964) was an American writer, also involved in theater in various ways. With Irving Block he wrote the story for the screenplay for  Forbidden Planet, based on Shakespeare's The Tempest, but he was a victim of the Second Red Scare and was blacklisted from the film industry.

Biography
Adler was the son of Abe Adler (a stage manager) who, in turn, was the son of Yiddish theater star Jacob Adler by his first wife Sonya ("Sophia") Adler. Per the bio on back jacket of Adler's novel Mach 1, "He majored in English at New York University, wrote publicity for Robert Ripley of 'Believe It Or Not,', owned a New York theatre at twenty-one, presented touring opera companies, served in the air force in World War II in the Fifth Air Force, Far Eastern Air Force and Thirteenth Bomber Command. He produced a revival of Front Page, has written both original stories and screenplays for the motion pictures."

In addition to Forbidden Planet, Adler has a story credit for the film The Giant Behemoth (1959).

The New York Times of February 1, 1964, includes Adler's obituary, giving the date of his death as January 30, 1964. It says he was born in New York, the son of Adolf Adler, Yiddish theater manager and owner. He was survived by his widow, the former Mary MacNamara, and two daughters, Pamela and Allison Jo.

Works
Mach 1: A Story of Planet Ionus (1957)

References

Notes
— Writers Guild Announces 21 Credit Corrections For Films Written by Blacklisted Writers
 Adler, Jacob, A Life on the Stage: A Memoir, translated and with commentary by Lulla Rosenfeld, Knopf, New York, 1999, 386 (commentary).

External links
 

 

20th-century American novelists
20th-century American male writers
American male novelists
Hollywood blacklist
American science fiction writers
American male screenwriters
American people of Ukrainian-Jewish descent
Jewish American screenwriters
Writers from New York City
1916 births
1964 deaths
Novelists from New York (state)
Screenwriters from New York (state)
20th-century American screenwriters
United States Army Air Forces personnel of World War II
20th-century American Jews